Luo Yuan is the pinyin romanization of various Chinese names. It may refer to:

 Luo Yuan (羅願), Southern Song scholar and author of the Erya Yi
 Luo Yuan (罗援), rear admiral in the PRC navy